Albert Davis Prebble (22 October 1873 – 27 August 1946) was an English badminton and tennis player and a prominent badminton official. He captained the England badminton team in their first international match against Ireland in 1903. He won the All England badminton men's doubles three times. He also won the badminton mixed doubles in 1909 with Dora Boothby, the same year that he reached the Wimbledon Championships mixed doubles final with the same partner. 
   
He was Vice-President of the English Badminton Association from 1922-1946).

Medal Record at the All England Badminton Championships

References

English male badminton players
English male tennis players
British male tennis players
1873 births
1946 deaths
Place of birth missing